Karl Konrad Gutbrod (10 March 1844 – 17 April 1905) was a German lawyer and judge. From 1 November 1903  until his death he was the President of the Reichsgericht, the supreme court of the Deutsches Reich.

References

1844 births
1905 deaths
Jurists from Baden-Württemberg
20th-century German judges
People from Stuttgart